Crataegus purpurella, also known as the Loch Lomond hawthorn, is a plant in the Crataegus genus. It is endemic to Saskatchewan, Canada, and is unranked by NatureServe.

References 

Endemic flora of Canada
purpurella